Triller is a group of birds of the cuckoo-shrike family belonging to the genus Lalage.

Triller may also refer to:
Triller, German term for a trill in music
Triller (company), the company that owns the Triller app
Triller (app), social media app

See also
 Thriller (disambiguation)
 Trill (disambiguation)